Higashio (written: 東尾) is a Japanese surname. Notable people with the surname include:

, Japanese baseball player
, Japanese golfer

Japanese-language surnames